The Moorabool River is a river in Victoria, Australia, that runs past several small towns and areas such as Meredith, Anakie, and Staughton Vale (north-west of Geelong). The river joins with the Barwon River at Fyansford.

Bridges

The river features several historic bridges, many built in colonial bluestone.

Batesford Bridge
Batesford was originally the site of a ford over the Moorabool River.

The first bridge at Batesford was built by the Corio and Bannockburn shire councils in 1846. Provided with a tollgate, the wooden bridge was located upstream from the ford, and collapsed in 1847. It was again rebuilt in wood in 1848, and was damaged by flood in 1852 and later repaired. A bluestone bridge was built in 1859, which still exists today as a service road. The current concrete bridge of the Midland Highway was built in 1972 on a new alignment.

Fyansford Bridge
The first river crossing at Fyansford was again a ford.

The first wooden bridge was built downriver from the ford by the Shire of Corio and Shire of Bannockburn in 1854, and was tolled until 1877. It was in poor condition by 1898, with load restrictions being put into place. A new bridge was built nearby in 1900 by John Monash and J. T. N. Anderson, the three arch bridge being the largest Monier reinforced concrete bridge in world at the time.

In 1970 a new bridge was built on the site of the old wooden bridge to cater for heavier traffic on the Hamilton Highway, the 1900 bridge retained for pedestrians.

Geelong Ring Road

Work on the Geelong Ring Road bridge commenced in late 2006. Costing $15.5 million, it carries four lanes of traffic and is the largest bridge on the road featuring 70 beams and 12 piers. The final span was installed on March 6, 2008. It has since been named the Lewis Bandt Bridge.

Moorabool Viaduct
It remains in use today, having been reinforced with extra steel piers in 1918, to a design of Victorian Railways engineer Frederick Esling.

References

External links

Moorabool River at BIRD (wiki)
People for A Living Moorabool

Corangamite catchment
Rivers of Barwon South West (region)
Rivers of Grampians (region)
Geography of Geelong